Khaidi Rudrayya is a 1986 Indian Telugu-language action drama film directed by A. Kodandarami Reddy who also wrote the screenplay for a story by Paruchuri Brothers; produced by T. Trivikrama Rao for Vijaya Lakshmi Art Pictures. The film stars Krishna in the titular role alongside Sridevi and Sarada with Rao Gopala Rao enacting the main antagonist. The film was recorded as a Blockbuster at the box office.

The film has musical score by K. Chakravarthy. The film marked the last collaboration of Kodandarami Reddy-Krishna-Sridevi trio though Reddy and Krishna worked together one last time in Sardar Krishnama Naidu. The film was remade in Hindi as Waqt Ki Awaz (1988) with Sridevi reprising her role.

Plot 
Rudramaraju, alias Rudrayya is arrested for brutally hacking a local thug. The judge however frees him with some hidden agenda. It is revealed that Rudrayya had given shelter to Latha, the adopted daughter of a wealthy Eswara Rao, when the latter was forced into marrying the good-for-nothing Venkatagiri by her uncle Phanibhushan Rao.

Phanibhushan unsuccessfully persuades her in returning to her estate. His plot to take her forcefully is thwarted by Rudrayya forcing his goons to kidnap and murder Rudrayya's sister, Lakshmi as retaliation. Rudrayya killed one of those thugs in the beginning and now proceeds to finish off Rao and his lieutenant, Kotigadu.

He learns from Yasodhara Devi who has resigned her position that the same goons had killed her husband and kidnapped her only daughter several years ago. However, Rao manages to get a recording of Devi confessing to have freed Rudrayya on purpose despite knowing him to be culpable and gives it to higher authorities thereby getting her arrested.

An enraged Rudrayya now sets out on a crusade to rescue Latha who happens to be Yasodhara's daughter from the evil Rao and get him punished for his crimes. How he accomplishes his task forms the rest of the story.

Cast 
 Krishna as Rudramaraju "Rudrayya"
 Sridevi as Latha
 Sarada as Yasodhara Devi
 Rao Gopala Rao as Phanibhushan Rao
 Kaikala Satyanarayana as Phanibhushan Rao's elder son
 Gummadi
 Giribabu as Venkatagiri"Giri"
 Allu Ramalingaiah
 Chalapathi Rao as Kotigadu
 Nutan Prasad

Soundtrack 
The film had its soundtrack album comprising six tracks scored and composed by K. Chakravarthy with the lyrics penned by Veturi Sundararama Murthy.
 "Atthadi Atthadi" — P. Susheela, Raj Sitaram
 "Manjuvaani Intilo" — P. Suseela, Raj Sitaram
 "Neeku Chakkiliginthalu" — P. Suseela, Raj Sitaram
 "Pooletthi Kottamaaku" — S. Janaki, Raj Sitaram
 "Raa Guru" — P. Susheela, Raj Sitaram
 "Srungara Veedhilo" — Raj Sitaram, P. Suseela

References

External links 

1986 films
Indian action drama films
1980s masala films
Telugu films remade in other languages
Films directed by A. Kodandarami Reddy
Films scored by K. Chakravarthy
1980s action drama films
1980s Telugu-language films